Let's Get Christmas is an EP by Mike Viola & the Candy Butchers. It was released in 1999 on Sony Records as a throw-away bonus to the Candy Butchers then recently released album Falling into Place. It includes two covers: an acoustic version of the Backstreet Boys' "I Want It That Way" (recorded live at The Kitchen on November 1, 1999), and a rocked up version of Mariah Carey's "All I Want for Christmas Is You."

Track listing
 "Give Me a Second Chance for Christmas" – 3:17
 "I Want It That Way" (Live) – 3:52
 "All I Want for Christmas Is You" – 3:49
 "Christmas in Venice" – 1:57
 "Doin' It the Reggae Way" (Bonus track) – 4:27

References

1999 EPs
Mike Viola albums
1999 Christmas albums
Christmas albums by American artists
Pop rock Christmas albums